Januszew  is a village in the administrative district of Gmina Młodzieszyn, within Sochaczew County, Masovian Voivodeship, in east-central Poland. Januszew has hosted the Młodzieszyn Polish Culture Festival each April since 2002.

References

Januszew